The following is a list of notable burials at Brookwood Cemetery near Woking in Surrey.

 

 

 

William Addison (VC)
Alexis Theodorovich Aladin
Omar Ali-Shah
Abdullah Yusuf Ali
Aftab Ali
Naji al-Ali
Syed Ameer Ali
Abdul Rahman Andak
Richard Ansdell
Margaret Campbell, Duchess of Argyll
Muhammad al-Badr
Robert Nisbet Bain
Daniel Marcus William Beak
Dudley Beaumont
John Hay Beith
Boris Berezovsky (businessman)
Mancherjee Bhownagree
Charles Bradlaugh
Benjamin Thomas Brandreth-Gibbs
Harold Brown
Robert Ashington Bullen
Bennet Burleigh
Llewellyn Cadwaladr
Frederic Chase
Sir James Charles Chatterton, 3rd Baronet
Styllou Christofi
Willy Clarkson
Marcel Clech
Lord Edward Clinton
Edward Compton
Richard Congreve
Admiral Robert Coote
Alexander Angus Croll
Arthur Cumming (Royal Navy officer)
Dadiba Merwanji Dalal
Evelyn De Morgan
John Eugène, 8th Count de Salis-Soglio
William De Morgan
Dugald Drummond
John Lowther du Plat Taylor
Cosmo Duff-Gordon
Fortunatus Dwarris
Gai Eaton
Charles Edmonds
Thomas Farrer, 1st Baron Farrer
Maurice Fitzmaurice
William Forsyth
Douglas Freshfield
Cyril Frisby VC
John Augustus Fuller
James Galloway (physician)
Reginald Ruggles Gates
Eric Neville Geijer
Carroll Gibbons
Charles Tyrrell Giles
Henry Goldfinch
Robert Freke Gould
Ramadan Güney
Foulath Hadid
Mohammed Hadid
Zaha Hadid
William Henry Hadow
Aylmer Haldane
Sir Archibald Hamilton, 5th Baronet
Dudley Hardy
Edmund Hartley VC
Thomas Hawksley
Rowland Allanson-Winn, 5th Baron Headley
Henry Heath
Christopher Hewett, actor best known for his role of the title character on Mr. Belvedere
Frank Hoar
James Hollowell VC
Emma Hosken
Thomas Humphrey
Alfred William Hunt
Violet Hunt
Edgar Inkson VC
Rebecca Isaacs
Samuel Swinton Jacob
Jeejeebhoy Piroshaw Bomanjee Jeejeebhoy
Samuel Johnson (comedian)
William Kenny (VC)
Johanna Kinkel
Robert Knox
Lady Henry Somerset
Gottlieb Wilhelm Leitner
Dugald McTavish Lumsden
Alexander Mackonochie
Mahmoud Kahil
Mary Horner Lyell
Louis Mallet
Andrew Mamedoff
Thomas Manders
Ross Mangles VC
John Charles Oakes Marriott 
Buck McNair
Homi Maneck Mehta
Matthew Fontaine Maury Meiklejohn
Hamid Mirza
Ernest William Moir
Margaret, Lady Moir
Francis David Morice
Daniel Nicols
Sir Michael O'Dwyer
John Humffreys Parry
General Sir Robert Phayre
Marmaduke Pickthall
Zdeňka Pokorná
Abdullah Quilliam
Margaret Raine Hunt
Sir Henry Rawlinson, 1st Baronet
William Reynolds (VC)
Sir William Robertson, 1st Baronet
William Stewart Ross
Said bin Taimur
Shapurji Saklatvala
Nowroji Saklatwala
John Singer Sargent
Edward Saunders
Shelley Scarlett
Harry Seeley
Idries Shah
Ikbal Ali Shah
Saira Elizabeth Luiza Shah
John Sherwood-Kelly VC
Daniel Solander
Newton John Stabb
Jane Stephens (actress)
Marie Spartali Stillman
William James Stillman
James T. Tanner
Dorabji Tata
Jamsetji Tata
Ratanji Tata
Eustace Tennyson d'Eyncourt
Edith Thompson - removed to the City of London Cemetery in 2018
Edward Maunde Thompson
John Tiller
Montagu Towneley-Bertie
J. H. A. Tremenheere
Thomas Twisden Hodges
Joe Vandeleur
Douglas Vickers
Albert Visetti
Charles Warne
David Waterlow
Rebecca West
Dennis Wheatley
John Wolfe Barry
Henry Saint Clair Wilkins
Adolphus Williamson
Bernhard Wise
Bernard Barham Woodward
Wallace Duffield Wright
John Wrightson
F. F. E. Yeo-Thomas

References